Sounds from Rikers Island is an album by jazz pianist Elmo Hope recorded in 1963 for the Audio Fidelity label.

Reception

The Allmusic review by Thom Jurek stated "As a musical document, it is an overwhelming success. Hope surrounds himself with musicians whose reputations are now legendary... the level of musical empathy and improvisational reciprocity is inspiring. This is an obscure date but it shouldn't be, as it features some of Hope and Gilmore's finest playing, and shows Jones in rare, lighthearted form".

Track listing
All compositions by Elmo Hope except as indicated
 "One for Joe"  - 4:34  
 "Ecstasy" - 3:15  
 "Three Silver Quarters" - 4:45  
 "A Night in Tunisia"  (Dizzy Gillespie, Frank Paparelli) - 5:57  
 "Trippin'" - 3:19  
 "It Shouldn't Happen to a Dream" (Duke Ellington, Don George, Johnny Hodges) - 4:07  
 "Kevin"  - 4:15  
 "Monique" - 3:02  
 "Groovin' High" (Gillespie) - 2:59

Personnel 
Elmo Hope - piano 
Lawrence Jackson - trumpet 
Freddie Douglas - soprano saxophone
John Gilmore - tenor saxophone 
Ronnie Boykins - bass
Philly Joe Jones - drums
Earl Coleman, Marcelle Daniels – vocals

References 

1963 albums
Audio Fidelity Records albums
Elmo Hope albums
Rikers Island